Top Rank Tennis  is a tennis video game from Nintendo. Players can play against each other by linking two Game Boys.

Reception

GB Action gave the game a score of 90% praising the gameplay and the graphics as well as the game's difficulty. Power Unlimited gave Top Rank Tennis a score of 70% writing: "It's hardly spectacular, but Top Rank Tennis is a good game nonetheless. The rules are all there and it looks good compared to other Game Boy games. You need a very fast reaction time if you want to win.

References 

1993 video games
Tennis video games
Game Boy games
Nintendo games
Pax Softnica games
Multiplayer and single-player video games